Sanhe is a town in northeastern Guangdong province, China, in the valley of the Mei River. , it has one residential community and 12 villages under its administration.

See also
List of township-level divisions of Guangdong

References

Towns in Guangdong
Dabu County